There have been four presidential campaigns waged by Donald Trump for President of the United States. He has additionally mused about running on several other occasions.

Donald Trump presidential campaign may refer to:

 Donald Trump 2000 presidential campaign for the Reform Party of the United States of America, withdrew from the race
 Donald Trump 2016 presidential campaign as a Republican, elected president
 Donald Trump 2020 presidential campaign as a Republican, lost the general election to Joe Biden
 Donald Trump 2024 presidential campaign as a Republican, announced